The Plagmann Round Barn is an historic building located near Conroy in rural Iowa County, Iowa, United States. It was built in 1912 as a cattle barn by Charles and Richard Plagmann. The building is a true round barn that measures  in diameter. It is one of the largest Iowa Agriculture Experimental Station/Matt King type barns in the state. It is three floored — at the bottom is the feeding floor, at the middle is the stalls and at the top is the haymow. The barn is constructed of terracotta clay tile and features an aerator, a two-pitch roof and a 16-foot (4.9 m) central silo. It has been listed on the National Register of Historic Places since 1986.

References

Infrastructure completed in 1912
Buildings and structures in Iowa County, Iowa
National Register of Historic Places in Iowa County, Iowa
Barns on the National Register of Historic Places in Iowa
Round barns in Iowa